The Mother’s Building, also known as the Delia Fleishhacker Memorial Building, is a historic building that was once part of the Fleishhacker Pool and Fleishhacker Playfield and features Works Progress Administration-era murals, built in 1925 and is presently located within the San Francisco Zoo and Gardens.

The building has been listed as a San Francisco Designated Landmark, since September 16, 2022; a listed California Historical Landmark since December 31, 1979; and listed in the National Register of Historic Places, since December 31, 1979.

History 
The Mother’s Building was originally part of the Fleishhacker Pool and Fleishhacker Playfield, commissioned by Herbert Fleishhacker, and Mortimer Fleishhacker; and built in 1925. It was in dedication to their late-mother, Delia Stern Fleishhacker. The Mother’s Building was originally located next to a large wading pool. It served as a lounge (with restrooms, nurseries, clinical rooms, and tea) for mothers with small children, no boys over the age of 6 were allowed inside. The wading pool was removed in the 1940s, and was replaced with a children's zoo by the 1960s.

The building is a single room that was designed by American architect George W. Kelham. The style of the building is late 19th-century or early 20th-century Italian Renaissance Revival architecture. The exterior features a red Mission tiled roof, and five arches with Corinthian columns and pilasters.

Mosaics 
The loggia's side walls are decorated with mosaics created by Helen Bruton, Margaret Bruton, and Ester Bruton for the Public Works of Art Project; with imagery of Saint Francis of Assisi with animals, and another panel with children and animals. The Bruton sisters were originally from Alameda, California and had helped revitalize the art of decorative mosaics.

Murals 
On the interior, there is wood paneling, with carved flower details around the door frames; and with four painted murals in the upper section depicting four scenes of Noah's Ark and animals. The four interior murals were painted with egg tempera, which were begun in 1933 and completed in 1938, painted by Helen Katharine Forbes and Dorothy Wagner Puccinelli for the Federal Art Project.

It is believed that the interior murals may be beyond the point of repairs as the paintings have faded, the walls have deteriorated in places, and some of the damages maybe due to the proximity to the ocean. However other WPA-era murals, such as those at Beach Chalet and Coit Tower have gone through restoration.

Zoo gift shop and visitors center 
From 1973 until 2002, the Mother's Building served as a gift shop and visitors center for the zoo. The building is in need of seismic safe updates and the interior murals need restoration; more recently the room is only used for special events.

The Mother’s Building is the only remaining structure from the Fleishhacker Pool and Fleishhacker Playfield complex. It is believed that the Mother's Building was the only west coast structure of this type.

See also 
 California Historical Landmarks in San Francisco
 List of San Francisco Designated Landmarks
 National Register of Historic Places listings in San Francisco

References 

San Francisco Designated Landmarks
National Register of Historic Places in San Francisco
Buildings and structures completed in 1925
Mediterranean Revival architecture in California
Public art in California
Art in San Francisco
1925 establishments in California
California Historical Landmarks